Gull Bay First Nation or Kiashke Zaaging Anishinaabek (Gayaashki-zaagiing Anishinaabeg in the Fiero orthography) is an Anishinaabe (Ojibway) First Nation band government located in Thunder Bay District in northwestern Ontario, Canada. As of May 2010, the First Nation had a registered population of 1,149 people, including an on-Reserve population of 328.

Governance

The Chief and 10 Band Council members elected every 4 years under the First Nations Elections Act Electoral system. Before 2012, the council had 11 members but it was narrowed down to ten council members, with the passing of a council member. The current Chief is Wilfred King, whose first term began on January 12, 2013 (at the time, it was a 2-year term). The current councillors are Anthony Esquega, Brian King, Gwendoline King, Hugh King, Kenny King, Kevin King, Wayne King, Hector Murchinson, Roland Poile, Lawrence Shonias Sr, and Marcel Shonias. The next election will take place in November 2020.

As a signatory to the Robinson Superior Treaty of 1850, Kiashke Zaaging Anishinaabek is a member of the Nokiiwin Tribal Council, a Regional Chiefs Council, and the Union of Ontario Indians, a Political Territorial Organization that represents many of the Anishinaabe First Nation governments in Ontario located about Lake Superior and Lake Huron.

In August 2019, the community shut down its diesel electric generator for the first time in 60 years, drawing power from a new solar panel installation.  Diesel is still used overnight.

List of Chiefs

 Wilfred King (December 14, 2000 to December 10, 2022)
 Miles Nowegejick (December 10, 2010 to January 12, 2013)
 Wilfred King (January 12, 2013 to present)

Reserve

The Gull Bay First Nation has reserved for itself the  Gull River 55 Indian Reserve. The community of Gull Bay is located on this reserve.

Land claims

Reserve size 
The First nations signatories of the Robinson Superior Treaty were unfamiliar with the unit of the mile, and assumed it was the size of a league. The treaty gave each band a reserve of 16 square miles, which was much smaller than what the signatories expected. As soon as the error was noticed, the first nations notified the crown of the issue, and surveyors corrected the problem except for a few reserves, such as the Gull Bay First Nation, considered too far and too remote. The Gull Bay first nation filed a claim with the government of Canada on the issue of the size of their reserve in 2016.

Timber rights 
In 2016, the band voted to accept a 8.1 million dollar settlement from the government over timber royalties on the reserve.

References

AANDC profile

First Nations governments in Ontario
Communities in Thunder Bay District
Anishinaabe reserves in Ontario